Jintan is the trademarked name of a popular Japanese medicine/candy, developed by Morishita Hiroshi (1869–1943), and sold from the early twentieth century to today. Originally marketed as a cure-all for a number of ailments, Jintan is today thought of as a breath freshener only.

History 
Morishita Hiroshi was the eldest son of a priest at the Nunakuma-Shrine (Numakuma jinja) in Fukuyama, Hiroshima. 

After his father died, Morishita went to Osaka, and started to develop pharmaceutical products. 

He was also a pioneer of Japanese advertising.  

The silver coated pellet-like pills were advertised from 1904 through the end of World War II in 1945.

Meaning of Name
The name Jintan combines the Confucian term jin (humaneness, benevolence), with the Daoist term tan (cinnabar, pills containing cinnabar, pills (the Elixir of life)) evoking the notion of longevity and health.

Composition 
Jintan has about 16 ingredients including cinnamon, mint, cumin, clove, and Fructus Amomi.

Packaging
During the Russo-Japanese War the packaging was re-designed as a Meiji period soldier in court dress with bicorne.

Literature
 Sōgō hokenyaku Jintan kara sōgō hoken sangyō JINTAN e - Morishita Jintan 100nen kinenshi. Osaka: Jintan, 1995.
 Machida Shinobu: Jintan ha naze nigai? Meiji-Taishōki no yakuhin kōkoku- zuhanshū. Tokyo, Borantia jōhō-nettowaaku, 1997.

External links

Jintan website
Jintan Museum

References

Japanese brands
Japanese confectionery
Oral hygiene
Traditional Japanese medicine